Francesco Crispi was one of four s built for the  (Royal Italian Navy) in the 1920s. Completed in 1927, she served in World War II.

Design and description
The Sella-class destroyers were enlarged and improved versions of the preceding   and es. Their complement was 8–9 officers and 144 enlisted men.

Unlike the Parsons geared steam turbines used by her sister ships, Francesco Crispi used a pair of Belluzzo turbines, each driving one propeller shaft using steam supplied by three Thornycroft boilers.

Their main battery consisted of four  guns in one twin-gun turret aft of the superstructure and one single-gun turret forward of it. Anti-aircraft (AA) defense for the Sella-class ships was provided by a pair of  AA guns in single mounts amidships and a pair of  machine guns. They were equipped with four  torpedo tubes in two twin mounts amidships. The Sellas could also carry 32 mines.

Construction and career
Francesco Crispi was laid down by Pattinson at their Naples shipyard on 21 February 1923, launched on 12 September 1925 and commissioned on 29 April 1927.

Citations

Bibliography

External links
 Francesco Crispi Marina Militare website

Sella-class destroyers
Ships built in Naples
1925 ships
World War II destroyers of Italy
Maritime incidents in August 1944
Destroyers sunk by aircraft
Maritime incidents in October 1944
World War II shipwrecks in the Mediterranean Sea